Kaaryasthan is a 2010 Malayalam-language family drama film written by the duo Udayakrishna-Siby K. Thomas and directed by debutant Thomson K. Thomas. It stars Dileep, Akhila, Siddique, Madhu and Suraj Venjaramoodu. It was Dileep's 100th film. Akhila, a noted television anchor and dancer, debuted as an actress through this film. The film is an unofficial remake of Telugu film Kalisundam Raa with minor changes in the plot. The song Mangalangal vaarikkori featured many serial actors and others as cameos after Deewangi Deewangi from Om Shanti Om which featured 31 Bollywood actors as cameos. The film was released on November 5 coinciding with Diwali.The film received mainly positive reviews from critics became blockbuster at box office and it was also one of the highest grossing films of 2010.

Plot

The story is set in a picturesque landscape in a village called "Krishnapuram". The two tharavadus  (parentages) named Puthezhathu and Kizhakkedathu are situated in the same compound, and their members share a very great bonding with each other. The film begins with the celebration of Onam festival by the inmates of both the houses. Kizhakkedathu tharavadu's karanavar Krishna Warrier's eldest son Rajan is in love with one of the girls there but his marriage is fixed with Saraswathy, daughter of Sankaran Nair, the karanavar of Puthezhath family. Rajan and the girl elopes, and Saraswathy is later found dead in a quarry, apparently a suicide. Puthezhathu family believes that Kizhakkedathu family has cheated them, and thus they beat up Rajan, but Krishna Warrier comes to rescue him and also pulls him up on to the train, saying that he should never return. This led to enmity between both the families. As years pass, Krishnanunni, the hero of the story, is born to Rajan.

Rajan, along with his wife and children, now lives in Tenkasi in Tamil Nadu. He is now indulged in agriculture. He is assisted by his son Krishnanunni. During a clash in the market, the local thief Kalidas is beaten by Krishnanunni/Kuttan and his friend Vadivelu/Pottan, and is sacked and taken back in a bullock cart. Unfortunately, Kalidas escapes from the sack by jumping into a canal. When Unni and Vadivelu come to know about this, they tell their gang to beat him. Unfortunately, the sack was changed, and it was Ayyappan, the former Karyasthan of Kizhakkedathu family, who was under it. Ayyappan  tells Rajan about the impact caused by his elope and Saraswathy's death on the two families. Both are now sworn enemies, and they have built up walls around their homes. There also happened a lawsuit between them, in which Kizhakkedathu family failed. It was the members of Puthezhathu family who beat Ayyappan because he supported Kizhakkedathu and sacked him to Tenkasi. Unni then tells Rajan that he would go to pacify the two quarrelling families.

Then, Unni and Vadivelu reach Krishnapuram, but suddenly they find Kalidas at Kizhakkedathu tharavadu and is shocked to hear that he has been appointed as the karyasthan of Kizhakkedathu tharavadu. Kalidas had reached there the previous night, and Krishna Warrier, who mistook him as the karyasthan whom Ayyappan  told, appointed him. Kalidas has a plan to steal an idol of Lord Krishna from Kizhakkedathu tharavadu, and he traps Unni and Vadivelu by handing the idol to them. Krishna Warrier later comes and unknowing that Unni is his grandson, calls his workers and beat Unni and Vadivelu. Later, they reach Puthezhathu tharavadu and get job as karyasthan (manager) and watchman respectively. The plan is approved by Sankaran Nair soon, and Kumaran, the former karyasthan, is declassified as an out-worker.

Unni later tries to solve conflicts between the two families. It is during this time that the female lead, Sreebala enters. Vadivelu first flirts with her, but after hearing that she is also a member of Puthezhath family, he allows her to enter the home. Unni also interferes in Sreebala's college dance, changing the tune of her dance song. She later dances for the same tune. On the same day, she is harassed by Anand, the son of Kizhakkedathu Sreedharan, a businessman. Krishnanunni saves her, but lies that it was Anand's father who saved her. Later, the stolen idol of Lord Krishna is found in a gravel, near the paddy fields of both families.

Soon Krishnanunni begins his mission to unite the two families, his mission becomes a great success and it soon culminates in a marriage proposal between Anandh and Sreedevi, the sister of Sreebala, but Sreedevi confess to Krishnanunni that she is in love with a serial actor named Aby George, who is a Christian, and would end her life is she is forced into marrying Anand. Krishnanunni and Sreebala helps Sreedevi to elope with her boyfriend which creates further trouble in the family, and after knowing that Krishnanunni is Rajan's son, the Puthezhathu and Kizhakeddathu families break ties once again, but this time, Kizhakedathu family support Krishnanunni and welcomes Rajan back home.

The rift between the families is cleared when Krishnanunni finds out that Rajan's old friend Susheelan and his driver Gopalan were responsible for Saraswathi's death, and it was a planned murder. Both the families unite once again for killing Susheelan and Sreebala and Krishnanunni get married.

Cast

Dileep as Krishnanunni aka Kuttan
Siddique as Kizhakkedathu Rajan, Krishna Warrier's son and Krishnanunni's father
Madhu as Kizhakkedathu Krishna Warrier Rajan's father and Krishnannunni's grandfather 
Suraj Venjaramood as Vadivelu aka Pottan
Akhila as Sreebala
Biju Menon as Adv. Puthezhathu Jayashankar
G. K. Pillai as Puthezhathu Shankaran Nair
Nishanth Sagar as Anand
Janardhanan as Puthezhathu Surendran
K. B. Ganesh Kumar as SI Kizhakkedathu Sabarinath
Santhosh as Puthezhathu Vijayan
Sadiq as Puthezhathu Madhavan
Manoj Nair as Kizhakkedathu Raveendran
Ramu as Kizhakkedathu Sreedharan
Salim Kumar as Kalidas
Harisree Asokan as Kumaran, Puthezhathu Family's Karyasthan
Kochu Preman as Ayyappan Nair, Kizhakkedathu family's Former Karyasthan
Suresh Krishna as Susheelan
Shammi Thilakan as Gopalan, Susheelan's driver
Kozhikode Narayanan Nair as Swaminathan, Unni's grandfather
Kalabhavan Shajon as Aadu Ramu
Thesni Khan as Devika
Gayathri Priya as Ambika, Krishnanunni's Mother
Mahima Nambiar as Radhika, Krishnanunni's Sister
Lena as Saraswathi (Cameo Role)
Rajeev Roshan as Aby George
Vandana Menon as Sreedevi
Geetha Nair as Krishna Warrier's wife
Roslin as Shankaran Nair's wife
Anoop Chandran as Santhosh, Hotel Manager
Nandhu Pothuval as Sandeep, Landlord of Thenkasi
Charutha Baiju
Reshmi Boban
Deepika Mohan
Manju Satheesh as Kizhakkedath Family member
Mini Arun as Kizhakkedath Family member
Ancy as Puthezhath Family member
Kulappulli Leela as Bus Passenger
Sreekala Sasidharan as Herself (Cameo)

Soundtrack

The songs of the film are composed by Berny-Ignatious with lyrics written by Kaithapram Damodaran Namboothiri. The background score for the film is by Rajamani.

Release

Reception
Nowrunning.com labeling the film as "Disappointing", proceeding to highlight that "With all the formulaic elements intact, Karyasthan as Dileep's 100th film is a mega hit. Dileep and Suraj do manage to bring in a few giggles, but the film serves as a sure sign that Dileep needs to reinvent himself" and gave 2 stars Out of 5, while Moviebuzz of Sify.com gave positive verdict, stating that Director Thomson doesn't experiment much here and you can find every emotion in the required measures that would be essential in a formulaic film.", adding that it is "Masala Entertainer". Furthermore, he praised lead actor Dileep's "power packed" performance, citing that he "nails the character to perfection" and "carries the film to its winning point". The movie performed well at the box office and was declared a blockbuster.

Box office
The film was third grossing Malayalam film of the year 2010, and became commercial success. From 72 releasing centres, it grossed 1.65 crore distributor's share in its first week. Made on a budget of 2.5 crore, it got share of 4.5 crore from Kerala box office.

References

External links
 
 
 Nowrunning.com article
 Oneindia article

2010 films
Films scored by Berny–Ignatius
2010s Malayalam-language films
2010 directorial debut films
2010 romantic comedy-drama films
Indian romantic comedy-drama films
Indian family films
Films shot in Palakkad
Films shot in Ottapalam
Films shot at Varikkasseri Mana